Chick Quest are a post-punk/indie-rock band from Vienna, Austria. Their initial concept was to combine chord progressions from old 60s Italian Western film scores, such as work by Ennio Morricone, with the dancey Post-Punk of the late 70s and early 80s like Talking Heads, B52's, Manicured Noise or The Clash. The band name itself is a nod to cheesy 60s B-film titles and is meant to be taken as "A girl on a quest" as opposed to "Guys on a quest for chicks".

History 
Ryan White (vocals/guitar), an American expat from Athens, Georgia, now living in Vienna, Austria, began the project with his Austrian friend, Iris Rauh (drums), in early 2014. Their original goal was to create a live dance party for their friends in small clubs, playing music they like to dance to and can't usually find in Vienna. By mid 2014, they added Magdalena Kraev (bass) and completed the lineup by early 2015 with Marcus Racz (trumpet/keyboards)—both also Austrian.

Their original "dance party" idea eventually blossomed into bigger shows and festivals, a spot on Austrian television, a debut record in 2015 with glowing reviews, including its release mentioned on Pitchfork, songs premiered on KEXP & CMJ, and an honorable mention as one of six best albums of the year by Der Standard, one of Austria's biggest newspapers.

In 2016, the band started working on their second album, which was released in February 2017 and saw songs featured by AlternativePress, Noisey, and BrooklynVegan, among other outlets.

Discography

Studio albums 
 Vs. Galore (2015)
 Model View Controller (2017)

References

External links 
 Website
 Facebook 
 Bandcamp
 Soundcloud

Post-punk revival music groups